This is a list of electoral divisions and wards in the ceremonial county of Leicestershire in the East Midlands. All changes since the re-organisation of local government following the passing of the Local Government Act 1972 are shown. The number of councillors elected for each electoral division or ward is shown in brackets.

County council

Leicestershire
Electoral Divisions from 1 April 1974 (first election 12 April 1973) to 2 May 1985:

Electoral Divisions from 2 May 1985 to 5 May 2005:

Electoral Divisions from 5 May 2005 to 4 May 2017:

† minor boundary changes in 2013

Electoral divisions from 4 May 2017:

Unitary authority council

Leicester
Wards from 1 April 1974 (first election 7 June 1973) to 5 May 1983:

Wards from 5 May 1983 to 1 May 2003:

Wards from 1 May 2003 to 7 May 2015:

Wards from 7 May 2015 to present:

District councils

Blaby
Wards from 1 April 1974 (first election 7 June 1973) to 5 May 1983:

Wards from 5 May 1983 to 1 May 2003:

Wards from 1 May 2003 to present:

† minor boundary changes in 2015

Charnwood
Wards from 1 April 1974 (first election 7 June 1973) to 5 May 1983:

Wards from 5 May 1983 to 1 May 2003:

Wards from 1 May 2003 to present:

Harborough
Wards from 1 April 1974 (first election 7 June 1973) to 5 May 1983:

Wards from 5 May 1983 to 1 May 2003:

Wards from 1 May 2003 to 2 May 2019:

Wards from 2 May 2019 to present:

Hinckley and Bosworth
Wards from 1 April 1974 (first election 7 June 1973) to 5 May 1983:

Wards from 5 May 1983 to 1 May 2003:

Wards from 1 May 2003 to present:

Melton
Wards from 1 April 1974 (first election 7 June 1973) to 3 May 1979:

Wards from 3 May 1979 to 1 May 2003:

Wards from 1 May 2003 to present:

North West Leicestershire
Wards from 1 April 1974 (first election 7 June 1973) to 5 May 1983:

Wards from 5 May 1983 to 1 May 2003:

Wards from 1 May 2003 to 7 May 2015:

Wards from 7 May 2015 to present:

Oadby and Wigston
Wards from 1 April 1974 (first election 7 June 1973) to 3 May 1979:

Wards from 3 May 1979 to 1 May 2003:

Wards from 1 May 2003 to present:

Electoral wards by constituency

Bosworth
Ambien, Barlestone, Nailstone and Osbaston, Barwell, Burbage, St Catherines and Lash Hill, Burbage, Sketchley and Stretton, Cadeby, Carlton and Market Bosworth with Shackerstone, Earl Shilton, Hinckley Castle, Hinckley Clarendon, Hinckley De Montfort, Hinckley Trinity, Markfield, Stanton and Fieldhead, Newbold Verdon with Desford and Peckleton, Ratby, Bagworth and Thornton, Twycross and Witherley with Sheepy.

Charnwood
Anstey, Birstall Wanlip, Birstall Watermead, East Goscote, Ellis, Fairestone, Forest, Forest Bradgate, Groby, Mountsorrel, Muxloe, Queniborough, Rothley and Thurcaston, Syston East, Syston West, Thurmaston, Wreake Villages.

Harborough
Billesdon & Tilton, Bosworth, Fleckney, Glen, Kibworth, Lubenham, Market Harborough-Great Bowden and Arden, Market Harborough-Little Bowden, Market Harborough-Logan, Market Harborough-Welland, Oadby Brocks Hill, Oadby Grange, Oadby St Peter's, Oadby Uplands, Oadby Woodlands, South Wigston, Wigston All Saints, Wigston Fields, Wigston Meadowcourt, Wigston St Wolstan's.

Leicester East
Belgrave, Charnwood, Coleman, Evington, Humberstone and Hamilton, Latimer, Rushey Mead, Thurncourt.

Leicester South
Aylestone, Castle, Eyres Monsell, Freemen, Knighton, Spinney Hills, Stoneygate.

Leicester West
Abbey, Beaumont Leys, Braunstone Park and Rowley Fields, Fosse, New Parks, Westcotes, Western Park.

Loughborough
Barrow and Sileby West, Loughborough Ashby, Loughborough Dishley and Hathern, Loughborough Garendon, Loughborough Hastings, Loughborough Lemyngton, Loughborough Nanpantan, Loughborough Outwoods, Loughborough Shelthorpe, Loughborough Southfields, Loughborough Storer, Quorn and Mountsorrel Castle, Shepshed East, Shepshed West, Sileby, The Wolds.

North West Leicestershire
Appleby, Ashby Castle, Ashby Holywell, Ashby Ivanhoe, Bardon, Breedon, Castle Donington, Coalville, Greenhill, Hugglescote, Ibstock and Heather, Kegworth and Whatton, Measham, Moira, Oakthorpe and Donisthorpe, Ravenstone and Packington, Snibston, Thringstone, Valley, Whitwick.

Rutland and Melton
Asfordby, Bottesford, Braunston and Belton, Cottesmore, Croxton Kerrial, Exton, Frisby-on-the-Wreake, Gaddesby, Greetham, Ketton, Langham, Long Clawson and Stathern, Lyddington, Martinsthorpe, Melton Craven, Melton Dorian, Melton Egerton, Melton Newport, Melton Sysonby, Melton Warwick, Normanton, Oakham North East, Oakham North West, Oakham South East, Oakham South West, Old Dalby, Ryhall and Casterton, Somerby, Uppingham, Waltham-on-the-Wolds, Whissendine, Wymondham.

South Leicestershire
Blaby South, Broughton Astley-Astley, Broughton Astley-Broughton, Broughton Astley-Primethorpe, Broughton Astley-Sutton, Cosby with South Whetstone, Countesthorpe, Croft Hill, Dunton, Enderby and St John's, Lutterworth Brookfield, Lutterworth Orchard, Lutterworth Springs, Lutterworth Swift, Millfield, Misterton, Narborough and Littlethorpe, Normanton, North Whetstone, Pastures, Peatling, Ravenhurst and Fosse, Saxondale, Stanton and Flamville, Ullesthorpe, Winstanley.

See also
List of parliamentary constituencies in Leicestershire and Rutland

References

 
Leicestershire